The river Luộc (Vietnamese: sông Luộc) also known by the formal Sino-Vietnamese name sông Phú Nông, is a tributary river to the Hồng River and Thái Bình River.

Nguyễn Du wrote about the sông Luộc in his chữ Nho poem Feeling on Crossing the Phú Nông giang (渡富農江感作).

References

Rivers of Vietnam